Sebastião Tapajós (April 16, 1943 – October 2, 2021) was a Brazilian guitarist and composer from Santarém (Pará). He began learning guitar from his father when he was nine years old, and later studied at the Conservatório de Lisboa and at the Instituto de Cultura Hispânica de Madrid. In 1998 he composed the soundtrack for the local Pará film "Lendas Amazônicas". In the 2000s, Tapajós  performed in Europe. He recorded more than 50 albums in his career.

Discography
 1963 Apresentando Sebastião Tapajós e Seu Conjunto
 1968 O Violão e...Tapajós
 1972 Sebastiao Tapajos + Pedro dos Santos
 1976 Guitarra Fantástica
 1979 Violão & Amigos
 1982 Guitarra Criolla
 1982 Zimbo Convida Sebastião Tapajós
 1984 Maurício Einhorn & Sebastião Tapajós
 1986 Visões Do Nordeste
 1986 Painel
 1987 Villa-Lobos
 1988 Lado a Lado - Sebastião Tapajós and Gilson Peranzzetta  
 1989 Terra Brasis
 1989 Brasilidade - Sebastião Tapajós and João Cortez
 1990 Reflections - Sebastião Tapajós and Gilson Peranzzetta
 1993 Instrumental No Ccbb - Sebastião Tapajós, Gilson Peranzzetta, Maurício Einhorn and Paulinho Nogueira
 1997 Amazônia Brasileira - Sebastião Tapajós and Nilson Chaves
 1997 Ontem e Sempre
 1997 Afinidades - Sebastião Tapajós and Gilson Peranzzetta
 1998 Da Minha Terra - Sebastião Tapajós and Jane Duboc
 2001 Acorde Violão

References

External links
   Official Site
  eJazz.com Bio of Sebastião Tapajós (n.1944)
 
 

1943 births
2021 deaths
Brazilian composers
Brazilian guitarists
Brazilian male guitarists
People from Pará
Sonet Records artists